FAEMA (Italian acronym: Fabbrica Apparecchiature Elettromeccaniche e Affini) primarily engaged in the production of espresso machines, was founded in 1945 by Carlo Ernesto Valente, in Milan, Italy.
Faema was to become synonymous with the post-war production boom in Italy, by actively pursuing technological innovation as the company's driving force.

Company history 
In the 1950s, Faema began with horizontal boiler, lever piston machines, which were typical of the time. In 1961, however, Faema released the E61, an espresso machine introducing many 'firsts' which are still commonly found in most espresso machines.  The most significant was the delivery of pressurized water through a mechanical pump at approximately 9 bar (130.5 pounds per square inch), replacing the piston-lever designs of the 1950s. Faema circumvented the problem of running heated water through the pump, by running cold water through the pump, through a heat exchange tube through the steam boiler to flash heat the water, before entering the diffusion block and through the ground coffee to create an espresso. Faema also introduced a new grouphead that was kept warm by circulating water from the boiler through the grouphead in a thermosyphon circuit.  The grouphead was activated by a lever, which when partially open, allows the release of pressure created from the municipal water line.  That pressure soaked the coffee with brew-temperature water, allowing for a smoother extraction.  When the lever is fully raised, the pump is activated and the coffee is extracted at full pressure.

The implications of the technological innovation of the E61 was revolutionary, and allowed Faema to acquire a significant espresso machine market share within years. Faema recently reintroduced a replica model for commercial use.

Another impact of the E61 is in the home espresso machine market.  A generic replica version of the E61 grouphead, coupled with the heat exchange boiler has become popularized in Europe, North America, and Australia. While the aesthetic appeal of the E61 group is cited as a reason for its popularity, the grouphead paired with a heat exchange boiler also created a new level of home espresso quality for consumers. E61 is a registered trademark.

Cycling team

Faema has a long history of sponsoring cycling teams. They have acted as the main or sole sponsor of numerous cycling teams for many years, but also as co-sponsor. The best-known rider competing for a team sponsored by Faema was 5-time Tour de France champion Eddy Merckx.

See also 

 Bialetti
 Cimbali
 De'Longhi
 Elektra (espresso machines)
 FrancisFrancis
 Gaggia
 La Marzocco
 Rancilio
 Saeco
 List of Italian companies

References

External links

FAEMA website
The Benefits of an E61 Group Head

 
Coffee appliance vendors
Manufacturing companies established in 1945
Cooking appliance brands
Home appliance brands
Home appliance manufacturers of Italy
Manufacturing companies based in Milan
Espresso machines
Italian companies established in 1945
Italian brands
Cimbali
Coffee in Italy